Ivan Filipović Grčić (c. 1660 – 1715) was a Croatian Catholic priest, soldier, and writer.

Ivan Filipović Grčić was born in Sinj. He participated in the beginning of the Morean War, where he joined a group of men from the Cetina region to fight the Ottomans.

In 2016 the town of Sinj unveiled a statue in his honour.

References

Croatian writers
17th-century Croatian Roman Catholic priests
17th-century Croatian military personnel
18th-century Croatian military personnel
People from Sinj
Year of birth uncertain
1715 deaths
18th-century Croatian Roman Catholic priests